Charles C. Green (1873 – 1940), American politician from Ohio
C. C. Green, American politician from Arizona